Shlomi Arbeitman (born May 14, 1985) is an Israeli former professional footballer who played as a striker.

Club career
A young striker, Arbeitman joined Maccabi Haifa for the 2005–06 season. He regularly played for the Israeli under-21 national side and has twice played for the senior national team, scoring a hat-trick against Azerbaijan on his debut in February 2004.

Prior to joining Haifa, he played for Beitar Jerusalem making his debut on March 3, 2003, against Ashdod as an 87th-minute substitute.

He also played for Hapoel Petah Tikva to whom he was controversially sold from Beitar, as he was still owned by his youth club Beitar Nes Tubruk, one game into the 2004–05 season.
On January 16, 2008, Arbeitman was transferred on loan to Hapoel Tel Aviv until the end of the 2007–08 season.

On December 12, he held the highest "Goals Per Minute" score worldwide for 2010 based on the criteria of imscouting.com, scoring every 64.17 minutes on average.

In July 2010, Arbeitman transferred from Maccabi Haifa to Belgian side K.A.A Gent.  He was given the No. 23 jersey.  On July 31, 2010, he made his debut as a 70th-minute substitute for Adnan Čustović in Gent's 1–0 away win over KVC Westerlo.

in June 2014, Arbeitman returned to Israel and signed a 2-year contract with Hapoel Be'er Sheva. He moved to Hapoel Haifa on February 3, 2016.

On 26 September 2018, Arbeitman signed for Shimshon Kafr Qasim.

Club career statistics
(correct as of May 2013)

Honours

Club
Maccabi Haifa
 Israeli Premier League: 2005–06, 2008–09
 Toto Cup: 2005–06

Individual
 Israeli Premier League top scorer: 2009–10 (28 goals)

References

External links

Stats at Maccabi Haifa official website

1985 births
Living people
Israeli footballers
Beitar Nes Tubruk F.C. players
Beitar Jerusalem F.C. players
Hapoel Petah Tikva F.C. players
Maccabi Haifa F.C. players
Hapoel Tel Aviv F.C. players
K.A.A. Gent players
K.V.C. Westerlo players
R.A.E.C. Mons players
Hapoel Be'er Sheva F.C. players
Hapoel Haifa F.C. players
Maccabi Petah Tikva F.C. players
Hapoel Ra'anana A.F.C. players
Shimshon Kafr Qasim F.C. players
Hapoel Ashdod F.C. players
Ironi Modi'in F.C. players
Israeli Premier League players
Belgian Pro League players
Israeli expatriate footballers
Expatriate footballers in Belgium
Israeli expatriate sportspeople in Belgium
Footballers from Central District (Israel)
Israel under-21 international footballers
Israel international footballers
Association football forwards